Donald Lee Erickson (December 13, 1931 – August 1, 2012) was an American professional baseball pitcher who appeared in nine games Major League Baseball (MLB) as a relief pitcher for the Philadelphia Phillies in September of . Erickson was a native of Springfield, Illinois, and served his country with the United States Army, during the Korean War.

Erickson signed with the Phillies in 1951, and missed the 1952 and 1953 seasons while performing military service. Returning to the minor leagues in 1954, he spent most of the 1955 through 1957 seasons with the Class A Schenectady Blue Jays. In 1958, a strong season in the Double-A Texas League earned him a promotion to Philadelphia in September, when big-league rosters grew from 25 to 40 players. In his nine relief appearances, Erickson hurled 11 innings, allowing six earned runs on 11 hits and nine bases on balls, striking out nine. His lone decision, a loss, came on came on September 16 against the Chicago Cubs, and he was credited with his only save on September 10 against the Los Angeles Dodgers.

Erickson returned to the minors in 1959 and pitched in the Phillies' organization through 1962, his tenth and final professional season. He died in Springfield on August 1, 2012. A nephew, Roger Erickson, also a right-handed pitcher, had a six-year career in the American League (1978–1983), mostly with the Minnesota Twins.

References

External links

1931 births
2012 deaths
Baseball players from Illinois
Buffalo Bisons (minor league) players
Chattanooga Lookouts players
Dallas Rangers players
Lima Phillies players
Louisville Colonels (minor league) players
Major League Baseball pitchers
Miami Marlins (IL) players
Philadelphia Phillies players
Salt Lake City Bees players
Schenectady Blue Jays players
Sportspeople from Springfield, Illinois
Syracuse Chiefs players
Tulsa Oilers (baseball) players